Egaña is a village in the Soriano Department of western Uruguay.

Geography
The railroad track from Montevideo to Mercedes and further north passes through the village.

History
On 13 May 1971, the status of the populated centre here was elevated to "Pueblo" (village) by the Act of Ley Nº 13.959.

Population
In 2011 Egaña had a population of 783.
 
Source: Instituto Nacional de Estadística de Uruguay

References

External links
INE map of Egaña

Populated places in the Soriano Department